Bill Collins (23 January 1933 – 5 March 2004) was an Australian rules footballer who played for the Hawthorn Football Club in the Victorian Football League (VFL).

Notes

External links 

1933 births
2004 deaths
Australian rules footballers from Victoria (Australia)
Hawthorn Football Club players